Val-d'Oire-et-Gartempe is a commune in the Haute-Vienne department in the Nouvelle-Aquitaine region in western France. It was established on 1 January 2019 by merger of the former communes of Bussière-Poitevine (the seat), Darnac, Saint-Barbant and Thiat.

See also
Communes of the Haute-Vienne department

References

Communes of Haute-Vienne